General elections were held in Dominica on 31 October 1951. No political parties contested the elections and all candidates ran as independents. Voter turnout was 75.9%.

Results

References

Dominica
Elections in Dominica
General
Non-partisan elections
British Windward Islands
Dominica
October 1951 events in North America